Euglenids (euglenoids, or euglenophytes, formally Euglenida/Euglenoida, ICZN, or Euglenophyceae, ICBN) are one of the best-known groups of flagellates, which are excavate eukaryotes of the phylum Euglenophyta and their cell structure is typical of that group. They are commonly found in freshwater, especially when it is rich in organic materials, with a few marine and endosymbiotic members.  Many euglenids feed by phagocytosis, or strictly by diffusion. A monophyletic group consisting of the mixotrophic Rapaza viridis (1 species) and the two groups Eutreptiales (24 species) and Euglenales (983 species) have chloroplasts and produce their own food through photosynthesis. This group is known to contain the carbohydrate paramylon.

Euglenids split from other Euglenozoa more than a billion years ago. The plastids in all extant photosynthetic species is the result from secondary endosymbiosis between a phagotrophic eukaryovorous euglenid and a Pyramimonas-related green alga.

Structure 
Euglenoids are distinguished mainly by the presence of a type of cell covering called a pellicle. Within its taxon, the pellicle is one of the euglenoids' most diverse morphological features. The pellicle is composed of proteinaceous strips underneath the cell membrane, supported by dorsal and ventral microtubules. This varies from rigid to flexible, and gives the cell its shape, often giving it distinctive striations. In many euglenids, the strips can slide past one another, causing an inching motion called metaboly. Otherwise, they move using their flagella.

Classification

The euglenids were first defined by Otto Bütschli in 1884 as the flagellate order Euglenida, as an animal.  Botanists subsequently created the algal division Euglenophyta; thus, they were classified as both animals and plants, as they share characteristics with both. Conflicts of this nature are exemplary of why the kingdom Protista was adopted.  However, they retained their double-placement until the flagellates were split up, and both names are still used to refer to the group. Their chlorophylls are not masked with accessory pigments.

Nutrition
The classification of euglenids is still variable, as groups are being revised to conform with their molecular phylogeny.  Classifications have fallen in line with the traditional groups based on differences in nutrition and number of flagella; these provide a starting point for considering euglenid diversity. Different characteristics of the euglenids' pellicles can provide insight into their modes of movement and nutrition.

As with other Euglenozoa, the primitive mode of nutrition is phagocytosis.  Prey such as bacteria and smaller flagellates is ingested through a cytostome, supported by microtubules.  These are often packed together to form two or more rods, which function in ingestion, and in Entosiphon form an extendable siphon.  Most phagotrophic euglenids have two flagella, one leading and one trailing.  The latter is used for gliding along the substrate.  In some, such as Peranema, the leading flagellum is rigid and beats only at its tip.

Osmotrophic euglenoids 
Osmotrophic euglenids are euglenids which have undergone osmotrophy.

Due to a lack of characteristics that are useful for taxonomical purposes, the origin of osmotrophic euglenids is unclear, though certain morphological characteristics reveal a small fraction of osmotrophic euglenids is derived from phototrophic and phagotrophic ancestors.

A prolonged absence of light or exposure to harmful chemicals may cause atrophy and absorption of the chloroplasts without otherwise harming the organism. A number of species exists where a chloroplast's absence was formerly marked with separate genera such as Astasia (colourless Euglena) and Hyalophacus (colourless Phacus). Due to the lack of a developed cytostome, these forms feed exclusively by osmotrophic absorption.

Reproduction 
Although euglenids share several common characteristics with animals, which is why they were originally classified as so, no evidence has been found of euglenids ever using sexual reproduction. This is one of the reasons they could no longer be classified as animals.

For euglenids to reproduce, asexual reproduction takes place in the form of binary fission, and the cells replicate and divide during mitosis and cytokinesis. This process occurs in a very distinct order. First, the basal bodies and flagella replicate, then the cytostome and microtubules (the feeding apparatus), and finally the nucleus and remaining cytoskeleton. Once this occurs, the organism begins to cleave at the basal bodies, and this cleavage line moves towards the center of the organism until two separate euglenids are evident. Because of the way that this reproduction takes place and the axis of separation, it is called longitudinal cell division or longitudinal binary fission.

Gallery

References

Bibliography
 Ciugulea, I. & Triemer, R. E. (2010) A Color Atlas of Photosynthetic Euglenoids. Michigan State University Press, East Lansing, MI, 204 p., .
 Leander, B. S., Triemer, R. E., & Farmer, M. A. (2001). Character evolution in heterotrophic euglenids. European Journal of Protistology, 37(3), 337-356, .
 Leander, B.S., Lax, G., Karnkowska, A., Simpson, A.G.B. (2017). Euglenida. In: Archibald, J.M., Simpson, A.G.B., Slamovits, C. (Eds.). Handbook of the Protists. Springer, pp. 1–42.  
 Leedale, G. F. (1978). Phylogenetic criteria in euglenoid flagellates. BioSystems 10: 183–187, .
 Wołowski, K & Hindák, F. (2005). Atlas of Euglenophytes. Cracow: VEDA Publishing House of the Slovak Academy of Sciences, 136 p., .

External links 
 
 The Euglenoid Project
 Tree of Life: Euglenida

Algal taxonomy
Euglenozoa
Extant Ypresian first appearances